Jonathan Hale Pittman (born February 9, 1963) is an American lawyer who serves as an associate judge of the Superior Court of the District of Columbia. Prior to assuming becoming a judge, he was the assistant deputy attorney general for the Civil Litigation division of the office of the Attorney General for the District of Columbia.

Education

Pittman received his Bachelor of Arts in economics from Vassar College in 1985 and his Juris Doctor from the Vanderbilt University Law School in 1990.

Career

Pittman is a former partner at Crowell & Moring. He clerked for Judge John A. Terry of the District of Columbia Court of Appeals.

D.C. superior court

In March 2017, Pittman was nominated by President Donald Trump to serve as an associate judge of the Superior Court of the District of Columbia. On September 12, 2017, the Senate Committee on Homeland Security and Governmental Affairs held a hearing on his nomination. On November 9, 2017, he was reported to the Senate floor by the committee. On January 25, 2018, the Senate confirmed his nomination by voice vote. He was sworn in on April 4, 2018.

References

External links
 Biography at District of Columbia Courts

1963 births
Living people
20th-century American lawyers
21st-century American judges
21st-century American lawyers
Judges of the Superior Court of the District of Columbia
Lawyers from New York City
Lawyers from Washington, D.C.
Vassar College alumni
Vanderbilt University Law School alumni